Sport Club Caiquetio (Dutch:Sport Vereniging), known as SC Caiquetio or simply Caiquetio, is an Aruban football club based in Paradera, which currently plays in Aruban Division Uno, the second tier of the national league, after being relegated from the Division di Honor in 2013–14.

Achievements

Aruban Division Uno: 2
2004–05, 2011–12

Players

Current squad
As of 28 October 2022

Current technical staff

External links
Official Website
Facebook page
Division Uno

References

Caiquetio